A geologist is a contributor to the science of geology. Geologists are also known as earth scientists or geoscientists.

The following is a list of notable geologists. Many have received such awards as the Penrose Medal or the Wollaston Medal, or have been inducted into the National Academy of Sciences or the Royal Society.

Geoscience specialties represented include geochemistry, geophysics, structural geology, tectonics, geomorphology, glaciology, hydrology, hydrogeology, oceanography, mineralogy, petrology, crystallography, paleontology, paleobotany, paleoclimatology, palynology, petroleum geology, planetary geology, sedimentology, soil science, stratigraphy, and volcanology. In this list, the person listed is a geologist unless another specialty is noted.  Only geologists with biographical articles in Wikipedia are listed here.

  

A

 Vladimir Abazarov (1930–2003), Soviet geologist, discoverer of Samotlor oil field
 Aziz Ab'Saber (1924–2012), Brazilian geomorphologist, member Brazilian Academy of Sciences
 Otto Wilhelm Hermann von Abich (1806–1886), German mineralogist
 Louis Agassiz (1807–1873), Swiss-American geologist, work on ice ages, glaciers, Lake Agassiz
 Georgius Agricola (Georg Bauer) (1494–1555), German naturalist and 'Father of Mineralogy', author of De re metallica
 Ulisse Aldrovandi (1522–1605), Italian, Renaissance naturalist
 Claude Allègre (born 1937), French geochemist, member of the French Academy of Sciences
 Fernando Flávio Marques de Almeida (1916–2013), Brazilian geologist, member Brazilian Academy of Sciences
 Walter Alvarez (born 1940), American, co-author of the impact theory for the Cretaceous–Paleogene extinction event
 J. Willis Ambrose (1911–1974), first President of Geological Association of Canada
 Roy Chapman Andrews (1884–1960), American explorer and naturalist; Mongolian dinosaurs
 Mary Anning (1799–1847), English pioneer fossil collector
 Adolphe d'Archiac (1802–1868), French paleontologist, member French Academy of Sciences
 Giovanni Arduino (1714–1795), Italian, first classification of geological time
 Richard Lee Armstrong (1937–1991), American/Canadian geochemist, won Logan Medal
 Rosemary Askin (born 1949), first New Zealand woman to undertake her own research program in Antarctica in 1970.
 Tanya Atwater (born 1942), California, American geophysicist, marine geologist, plate tectonics specialist
 Maurice Aubert (1914 – 2005), French geologist.

B

 Andrew Geddes Bain (1797–1864), South African, prepared first detailed geological map of South Africa
 Bashiru Ademola Raji, Nigerian geologist and pedogenesist
 Robert T. Bakker (born 1945), American dinosaur paleontologist; author, The Dinosaur Heresies
 Octávio Barbosa (1907–1997), Brazilian field geologist and prospector; Gold Medal, Sociedade Brasileira de Geologia
 Thomas Barger (1909–1986), American, pioneered oil exploration in Saudi Arabia, later CEO of Aramco
 Anthony R. Barringer (1925–2009), Canadian/American geophysicist and inventor
 Charles Barrois (1851–1939), French geologist and paleontologist
 Florence Bascom (1862–1945), American, first woman geologist at the US Geological Survey
Éliane Basse (1899–1985), French geologist and research director at the National Center for Scientific Research (CNRS)
 Abhijit Basu, Indian born American geologist
 Robert Bell (1841–1917), considered Canada's greatest explorer-scientist
 Walter A. Bell (1889–1969), Canadian paleobotanist and stratigrapher
 Helen Belyea (1913–1986), Canadian geologist best known for her research of the Devonian System.
 Reinout Willem van Bemmelen (1904–1983), Dutch, structural geology, economic geology and volcanology
 Etheldred Benett (1776–1845), English, pioneer paleontologist
 Pierre Berthier (1782–1861), French geologist, discovered the properties of bauxite
 Luca Bindi (born 1971), Italian geologist, discovered the first natural quasicrystal icosahedrite
 William Blake (1774–1852), President of the Geological Society of London 1815–1816
 William Phipps Blake (1826–1910), American geologist
 Selwyn G. Blaylock (1879–1945), Canadian chemist and mining executive with Cominco
 Stewart Blusson (born 1939), Canadian, co-discoverer of Ekati Diamond Mine
 Alexei Alexeivich Bogdanov (1907–1971), Soviet geologist
 Bruce Bolt (1930–2005), American (born Australia), pioneer engineering seismologist in California
 José Bonaparte (1928–2020), Argentinian paleontologist, discovered many South American dinosaurs
 William Borlase (1696–1772), Cornish natural historian, studied the minerals of Cornwall
 Norman L. Bowen (1887–1956), Canadian, pioneer experimental petrologist
 Scipione Breislak (1748–1826), Italian mineralogist and geologist, pioneer of volcanic gas collection
 J Harlen Bretz (1882–1981), American, discovered origin of channeled scablands
 David Brewster (1781–1868), Scottish physicist, studied the optical properties of minerals.
 Wallace S. Broecker (1931–2019), American paleoclimatologist and chemical oceanographer
 Robert Broom (1866–1951), South African palaeontologist, discovered australopithecine hominid fossils
 Barnum Brown (1873–1963), American, dinosaur hunter and self-taught paleontologist
 Christian Leopold von Buch (1774–1853), German geologist and paleontologist
 Mary Buckland (1797–1857), English, paleontologist, marine biologist and scientific illustrator
 William Buckland (1784–1856), English, wrote the first full account of a fossil dinosaur
 Judith Bunbury (born 1967), British, geoarchaeologist
 B. Clark Burchfiel (born 1934), MIT structural geologist, currently studying Tibetan plateau; member of National Academy of Sciences

C

 Louis J. Cabri (born 1934), Canadian, geologist and mineralogist, Fellow, Royal Society of Canada
 Stephen E. Calvert (born 1935), Canadian professor, geologist, oceanographer; awarded Logan Medal
 Colin Campbell (born 1931), British petroleum geologist and Peak Oil theorist
 Neil Campbell (1914–1978), Canadian, Northwest Territories mineral exploration; Fellow, Royal Society of Canada
 Samuel Warren Carey (1911–2002), Australian, continental drift proponent and later developed Expanding Earth hypothesis
 Petr Černý (1934–2018), Czech/Canadian mineralogist, won Logan Medal; Fellow, Royal Society of Canada
 Alexandre-Emile Béguyer de Chancourtois (1820–1886), French, geologist and mineralogist
 George V. Chilingar, American, distinguished international petroleum geologist
 Václav Cílek (born 1955), Czech geologist and science popularizer
 John J. Clague (born 1946), Canadian, Quaternary and geological hazards expert
 Thomas H. Clark (1893–1996), Canadian, co-author of The Geological Evolution of North America (1960)
 William Branwhite Clarke (1798–1878), Australian (born England), discovered gold in New South Wales, 1841
 Peter Clift (born 1966), British marine geologist and monsoon researcher, best known for work in Asia
 Hans Cloos (1885–1951), prominent German structural geologist
 Lorence G. Collins, (born 1931), American, petrologist, discoveries on metasomatism
 Simon Conway Morris (born 1951), palaeontologist and writer, best known for study of Burgess Shale fossils
 William Conybeare (1787–1857), English, author of Outlines of the Geology of England and Wales (1822)
 Isabel Clifton Cookson (1893–1973), Australian paleobotanist and palynologist, namesake of genus Cooksonia
 Edward Drinker Cope (1840–1897), American, pioneer dinosaur paleontologist; Bone Wars competitor
 Charles Cotton (1885–1970), New Zealand, geologist and geomorphologist
 James Croll (1821–1890), Scottish scientist who developed the theory of climate change based on changes in the Earth's orbit
 Georges Cuvier (1769–1832), French, proponent of catastrophism
 Lindsay Collins (1944–2015), Perth, West Australia

D

 G. Brent Dalrymple (born 1937), United States, author The Age of the Earth (1991), winner National Science Medal, 2005
 James Dwight Dana (1813–1895), American, author of System of Mineralogy (1837)
 Charles Darwin (1809–1882), British naturalist, author of On the Origin of Species
 George Mercer Dawson (1849–1901), Canadian, pioneer Yukon geologist, Fellow of the Royal Society
 John William Dawson (1820–1899), Canadian, pioneer Acadian geologist, Fellow of the Royal Society
 Henry De la Beche (1796–1855), English, first director of the Geological Survey of Great Britain
 Duncan R. Derry (1906–1987), Canadian economic geologist, awarded Logan Medal
 Nicolas Desmarest (1725–1815), French, pioneer volcanologist
 Thomas Dibblee (1911–2004), American, geological mapper and pioneer of San Andreas Fault movement study
 William R. Dickinson (1930–2015), Arizona, American, plate tectonics, Colorado Plateau; Member of National Academy of Sciences
 Robert S. Dietz (1914–1995), American, seafloor spreading pioneer, awarded Penrose Medal
 Déodat de Dolomieu (1750–1801), French geologist
Ljudmila Dolar Mantuani (1906-1988), Slovenian petrologist, first female professor of petrography in Yugoslavia 
 Louis de Loczy (1897–1980), Hungarian-Brazilian geologist
 Ignacy Domeyko (1802–1889), Slavic-Chilean geologist and mineralogist, namesake of the mineral domeykite
 Robert John Wilson Douglas (1920–1979), Canadian petroleum geologist, Fellow of the Royal Society of Canada
 Aleksis Dreimanis (1914–2011), Latvian-Canadian award-winning Quaternary geologist, Fellow of the Royal Society of Canada
 Hugo Dummett (1940–2002), South African mineral-exploration geologist, co-discoverer of Ekati Diamond Mine
 Alexander du Toit (1878–1948), South African geologist, established correlations between Argentina, Paraguay, Brazil and South Africa
 Clarence Edward Dutton (1841–1912), American, author of Tertiary History of the Grand Canyon District

E

 Heinz Ebert (1907–1983), German-Brazilian, geologist, petrologist; awarded Gold Medal, Sociedade Brasileira de Geologia
 Niles Eldredge (born 1943), American, paleontologist; theory of punctuated equilibrium
 Jean-Baptiste Élie de Beaumont (1798–1874), French, prepared first geological map of France
 W. G. Ernst (born 1931), American, Stanford petrologist and geochemist, member of National Academy of Sciences
 Pentti Eskola (1883–1964), Finnish geologist and professor who created the concept of metamorphic facies
 Robert Etheridge, Junior (1847–1920), Australian (born England) paleontologist, longtime curator of the Australian Museum
 Raul-Yuri Ervier (1909–1991), Soviet geologist, an eminent organizer and head of wide-ranging geological explorations that discovered of the largest oil and gas fields in Western Siberia
 Maurice Ewing (1906–1974), American, pioneering geophysicist and oceanographer

F

 Barthélemy Faujas de Saint-Fond (1741–1819), French, pioneer volcanologist
 Mikhail A. Fedonkin (born 1946), Russian paleontologist, awarded Charles Doolittle Walcott Medal
 Walter Frederick Ferrier (1865–1950), Canadian, mineral collector, namesake of the mineral Ferrierite
 Frederick C. Finkle (1865–1949), American consulting engineer and geologist; Chief Engineer on 18 major dam projects
 Michael Fleischer (1908–1998), American chemist and mineralogist
 Charles E. Fipke (born 1946), Canadian, co-discoverer of Ekati Diamond Mine
 Richard Fortey (born 1946), English, trilobite paleontologist, author, Fellow of the Royal Society
 Yves O. Fortier (1914–2014), Canadian, High Arctic explorer, won Logan Medal
 Gillian Foulger (born 1952), British, professor of geophysics at Durham University; awarded Price Medal
 William Fyfe (1927–2013), Canadian geochemist, won Wollaston Medal

G

 Patrick Ganly (1809–1899), Irish surveyor and geologist, described the use of cross-bedding in stratification
 Robert Garrels (1916–1988), American geochemist, revolutionized aqueous geochemistry
 Archibald Geikie (1835–1924), Scottish, geologist, President of the Royal Society
 Mark S. Ghiorso (born 1954), American geochemist, thermodynamic modeling of magma
 Grove Karl Gilbert (1843–1918), American, influential Western geologist, won Wollaston Medal
 James E. Gill (1901–1980), Canadian, McGill University professor, explorer, Logan Medal winner
 Victor Goldschmidt (1888–1947), Norwegian (born Switzerland), a founder of modern geochemistry
 Stephen Jay Gould (1941–2002), American paleontologist and writer
 L. C. Graton (1880–1970), American, Harvard economic geologist, awarded Penrose Gold Medal
 Alexander Henry Green (1832–1896), English, surveyed Derbyshire and Yorkshire, Fellow of the Royal Society
 George Bellas Greenough (1778–1855), English, gentlemanly geologist, founding member and first President of the Geological Society
 John Walter Gregory (1864–1932), English, geology of Australia and East Africa, glacial geology, President of the Geological Society of London (1928–1930) 
 Robbie Gries (born 1943), American, first female president (2001–02) of the American Association of Petroleum Geologists (AAPG)
 Djalma Guimarães (1894–1973), Brazilian geochemist and mineralogist in Minas Gerais
 Henry C. Gunning (1901–1991), Canadian (born Northern Ireland), British Columbia geologist, Logan Medal winner

H

 Julius von Haast (1824–1887), New Zealand (born Germany), founded Canterbury Museum
 Sir James Hall, 4th Baronet (1761–1832), Scottish geologist, president of the Royal Society of Edinburgh
 James Hall (1811–1898), American geologist and paleontologist
 William Hamilton (1731–1803), Scottish, volcanologist, Copley Medal
 Alfred Harker (1859–1939), English, igneous petrologist and petrographer
 W. Brian Harland (1917–2003), English, polar geologist
 Geoffrey Hattersley-Smith (1923–2012), English and Canadian, polar geologist
 Donald E. Hattin (1928–2016), American geologist and paleontologist
 Thomas Hawkins (1810–1889), English fossil collector
 James Edwin Hawley (1897–1965), Canadian, studied mineralogy of ore deposits
 Erasmus Haworth (1855–1932), founder of the Kansas Geological Survey and the first state geologist of Kansas
 Frank Hawthorne (born 1946), Canadian mineralogist and crystallographer
 Richard L. Hay (1929–2006), American geologist
 Ferdinand Vandeveer Hayden (1829–1887), American, pioneer Western geologist
 Robert Hazen (born 1948), American, mineralogist and astrobiologist
 Hollis Dow Hedberg (1903–1988), American geologist
 Bruce Heezen (1924–1977), American geologist who first mapped the Mid-Atlantic Ridge
 Sue Hendrickson (born 1949), American paleontologist; discoverer of "Sue", the largest Tyrannosaurus rex ever found
 Harry Hammond Hess (1906–1969), American geologist and oceanographer
 Henry Hicks (1837–1899), FRS, President of the Geological Society
 Pattillo Higgins (1863–1955), American, known as the "Prophet of Spindletop"
 Eugene W. Hilgard (1833–1916), American (born Germany), soil scientist
 Robert T. Hill (1858–1941), American geologist, Cretaceous deposits of Central Texas
 Claude Hillaire-Marcel (born 1944), Canadian (born France), Quaternary geologist
 Ferdinand von Hochstetter (1829–1884), German-Austrian, produced first regional New Zealand geological maps and surveys. 
 Paul F. Hoffman (born 1941), American and Canadian, Snowball Earth theorist
 Arthur Holmes (1890–1965), English, author of Principles of Physical Geology
 Marjorie Hooker (1908–1976), American, acted as a mineral specialist for the United States Department of State from 1943–1947
 Jack Horner (born 1946), American dinosaur paleontologist
 Kenneth J. Hsu (born 1929), American (born China), author of The Mediterranean was a Desert
 M. King Hubbert (1903–1989), American, originator of "Peak Oil" theory
 James Hutton (1726–1797), Scottish geologist, father of modern geology

I

 Edward A. Irving (1927–2014), Canadian, used paleomagnetism to support continental drift theory

J

 Thomas Jaggar (1871–1953), American, volcanologist and founder of the Hawaiian Volcano Observatory
 James A. Jensen (1911–1998), American, distinguished dinosaur paleontologist and sculptor
 Dougal Jerram (born 1969), British geologist/earth scientist, television and media presenter and author
 David A. Johnston (1949–1980), American, volcanologist, killed in the 1980 eruption of Mount St. Helens
 Franc Joubin (1911–1997), Canadian (born United States), discovered Elliot Lake uranium district
 John Wesley Judd (1840–1916), British geologist, professor at the Royal School of Mines, London

K

 Michael John Keen (1935–1991), Atlantic Canada, marine geoscientist
 Zofia Kielan-Jaworowska (1925–2015), Polish paleontologist, led several paleontological expeditions to the Gobi desert
 Clarence King (1842–1901), American, first director of the U.S. Geological Survey
 James Kitching (1922–2003), South African, Karoo vertebrate palaeontologist
 Sir Albert Ernest Kitson (1868–1937), Australian (born England), economic geologist, mineral exploration in Africa
 Maria Klenova (1898–1976), Russian marine geologist and one of the founders of Russian marine science
 Andrew H. Knoll (born 1951), American, Harvard geologist and paleontologist
 Alan S. Kornacki (born 1952), American, Harvard meteoriticist and geochemist for Royal Dutch Shell
 Danie G. Krige (1919–2013), South African mining engineer, inventor of kriging
 M. S. Krishnan (1898–1970), Indian geologist, author of Geology of India and Burma
 Thomas Edvard Krogh (1936–2008), Canadian, geochronologist, revolutionized uranium-lead radiometric dating
 William C. Krumbein (1902–1979), American, sedimentologist
 Nikolai Kudryavtsev (1893–1971), Russian petroleum geologist

L

 Charles Lapworth (1842–1920), English geologist, defined the Ordovician Period
 Andrew Lawson (1861–1952), American (born Scotland), named San Andreas fault
 Richard Leakey (1944–2022), Kenyan paleontologist
 Joseph LeConte (1823–1901), United States, first professor of geology, University of California
 Robert Legget (1904–1994), Canadian non-fiction writer, civil engineer, pedologist
 Inge Lehmann (1888–1993), Danish seismologist, discovered Lehmann discontinuity. The asteroid 5632 Ingelehmann was named in her honour.
 Luna Leopold (1915–2006), eminent American hydrologist
 Xavier Le Pichon (born 1937), French plate tectonics geophysicist
 Waldemar Lindgren (1860–1939), distinguished Swedish-American economic geologist
 Li Shizhen (1518–1593), Ming Dynasty Chinese mineralogist, author of the Ben Cao Gang Mu (Compendium of Materia Medica)
 Martin Lister (c. 1638–1712), English, pioneer geologist
 William Edmond Logan (1798–1875), Canadian, founded Geological Survey of Canada
 Fred Longstaffe, Canadian, Provost of University of Western Ontario
 Rosaly Lopes (born 1957), Brazilian, planetary geology and volcanology
 Sir Charles Lyell (1797–1875), Scottish geologist, popularized principle of uniformitarianism

M

 William Maclure (1763–1840), published first geologic map of United States (1809)
 J. Ross Mackay (1915–2014), Canadian permafrost geologist
 Robert Mallet (1810–1881), Irish, "father of seismology"
 Joseph A. Mandarino (1929–2007), American mineralogist
 Othniel Charles Marsh (1831–1899), American, pioneer dinosaur paleontologist; Bone Wars competitor
 Teresa Maryańska (1937–2019), Polish, paleontologist specializing in dinosaurs
 Kirtley F. Mather (1888–1978), Harvard professor, Scopes monkey trial
 William Williams Mather (1804–1859), professor, de facto state geologist of Ohio
 Drummond Matthews (1931–1997), British marine geologist, geophysicist, plate tectonics pioneer
 Sir Douglas Mawson (1882–1958), Australian Antarctic explorer
 Sir Frederick McCoy (c. 1817–1899), British and Australian palaeontologist and museum director
 Dan McKenzie (born 1942), British geophysicist, plate tectonics pioneer
 Digby McLaren (1919–2004), Canadian paleontologist, Fellow of the Royal Society
 Marcia McNutt (born 1952), American geophysicist and the 22nd president of the National Academy of Sciences (NAS) of the United States, 15th director of the United States Geological Survey (USGS) (and first woman to hold the post)
 Oscar Edward Meinzer (1876–1948), American hydrologist, "father of groundwater geology"
 Luiz Alberto Dias Menezes (1950–2014), Brazilian geologist and mineralogist
 Giuseppe Mercalli (1850–1914), Italian seismologist and volcanologist, developed the Mercalli intensity scale for measuring earthquakes
 Hans Merensky (1871–1952), South African economic geologist, discovered major diamond, platinum, chrome and copper deposits, including the Merensky Reef
 John C. Merriam (1869–1945), American, vertebrate paleontologist, studied fossils from La Brea Tar Pits
 Waman Bapuji Metre (1906–1970), Indian, petroleum geologist
 Ellen Louise Mertz (1896–1987), was one of Denmark's first female geologists and the country's first engineering geologist. 
Gerard V. Middleton (1931–2021), Canadian, sedimentologist, awarded Logan Medal
 Hugh Miller (1802–1856), Scottish, geologist, palaeontologist,  author, The Old Red Sandstone
 John Milne (1850–1913), British seismologist and anthropologist, Order of the Rising Sun
 Andrija Mohorovičić (1857–1936), Croatian meteorologist and seismologist, discovered Mohorovicic Discontinuity
 Friedrich Mohs (1773–1839), German, devised Mohs' scale of mineral hardness
 James Monger, Canadian Cordillera geologist, won Logan Medal
 Eldridge Moores (1938–2018), American plate tectonics pioneer and petrologist who specialized in ophiolites 
 Marie Morisawa (1919–1994), American geomorphology pioneer. The Geological Society of America established the Marie Morisawa Award in her honor. 
 W. Jason Morgan (born 1935), American plate tectonics pioneer, won National Medal of Science
 Eric W. Mountjoy (1931–2010), Canadian sedimentologist and petrologist, awarded Logan Medal
 Roderick Murchison (1792–1871), Scottish, author of The Silurian System (1839)
 Emiliano Mutti (born 1933), Italian petroleum geologist, won Twenhofel Medal

N

 Anthony J. Naldrett (1933-2020), Canadian (born England) nickel ore geologist
 E. R. Ward Neale (1923–2008), Atlantic Canada geologist
 John Strong Newberry (1822–1892), American, pioneer Western geologist and explorer
 Ernest (Ernie) H. Nickel (1925–2009), Canadian mineralogist
 Stephen Robert Nockolds (1909–1990), FRS and Murchison Medallist, petrologist
 Nils Gustaf Nordenskiöld (1792–1866), Finnish and Russian, mineralogist

O

 Henry Fairfield Osborn (1857–1935), American geologist and paleontologist
 Halszka Osmólska (1930–2008), Polish paleontologist specializing in dinosaurs
 John Ostrom (1928–2005), American, dinosaur paleontologist, discovered warm-blooded Deinonychus
 David Dale Owen (1807–1860), American, first state geologist of Indiana, Kentucky, and Arkansas

P

 Joseph Pardee (1871–1960), American, channeled scablands
 Clair Cameron Patterson (1922–1995), American, geochemist, fought lead poisoning
 R.A.F. Penrose, Jr. (1863–1931), American, mining geologist, Penrose Medal
 Francis J. Pettijohn (1904–1999), American, sedimentologist
 John Phillips (1800–1874), Yorkshire geologist
 John Arthur Phillips (1822–1887), FRS, Cornish geologist, metallurgist and mining engineer
 Vasiliy Podshibyakin (1928–1997), Soviet geologist, discoverer of Urengoy gas field
 Vladimir Porfiriev (1899–1982), Russian petroleum geologist
 Henry W. Posamentier (born 1948), American, petroleum geologist
 John Wesley Powell (1834–1902), American, ex-soldier who mapped the Colorado River, second director of the USGS
 Raymond A. Price (born 1933), Canadian, structural and tectonic geologist
 Raphael Pumpelly (1837–1923), American, geologist and explorer

R

 Bangalore Puttaiya Radhakrishna (1918–2012), a founder and officer of the Geological Society of India
 Frederick Leslie Ransome (1868–1935), American (born England), USGS economic geologist, National Academy of Sciences
 David M. Raup (1933–2015), American, paleontologist; author of  Extinction: Bad Genes or Bad Luck?
 Charles Richter (1900–1985), American seismologist, devised Richter magnitude scale for earthquakes
 Ferdinand von Richthofen (1833–1905), German geologist and geographer
 A.E. "Ted" Ringwood (1930–1993), Australian experimental geophysicist and geochemist, Wollaston Medal winner
 Andrés Manuel del Río (1764–1849), Spanish–Mexican mineralogist, discoverer of vanadium
 Alfred Rittmann (1893–1980), Swiss volcanologist, three-time president of the IAVCEI, Gustav Steinmann medal winner
 Ralph J. Roberts (1911–2007), American geologist, Nevada gold districts
 Meyer Rubin (1924-2020), American geologist, known for radiocarbon dating work with the USGS
 Stanley Keith Runcorn (1922–1995), British geophysicist and plate tectonics pioneer; Fellow of the Royal Society

S

 Donald F. Sangster, Canadian, lead-zinc economic geologist
 Emilia Săulea (1904–1998), Romanian geologist and paleontologist
 Celâl Şengör (born 1955), Turkish, member of The United States National Academy of Sciences and The Russian Academy of Sciences, Bigsby Medal, Gustav-Steinmann-Medaille and Arthur Holmes Medal winner
 Harrison Schmitt (born 1935), American, Apollo 17 moonwalker
 George Julius Poulett Scrope (1797–1876), English, volcanology, Wollaston Medal
 Adam Sedgwick (1785–1873), English, proposed Devonian and Cambrian periods
 Karl von Seebach (1839–1880), German volcanologist
 Seikei Sekiya (1855–1896), Japanese seismologist, created the model showing the motion of an earth-particle during an earthquake
 Nicholas Shackleton (1937–2006), British geologist and climatologist
 Shen Kuo (1031–1095), Chinese scientist, magnetic compass pioneer, geomorphology theory
 Richard H. Sibson (born 1945), New Zealand geologist, defined the relationship between seismogenic processes and fault zone rheology.
 Eugene Merle Shoemaker (1928–1997), American, meteoriticist, co-discovered Comet Shoemaker-Levy
 Haraldur Sigurdsson, (born 1939), Icelandic, provided proof for a meteorite impact at the time of the extinction of the dinosaurs
 Leon Silver (born 1925), American, National Academy, NASA medal for contribution to Apollo program's lunar explorations
 George Gaylord Simpson (1902–1984), American, paleontologist
 Kamini Singha (born 1977), professor at the Colorado School of Mines
 William Smith (1769–1839), father of English Geology
 Su Song (1020–1101), Chinese naturalist, author of treatise on metallurgy and mineralogy
 Paul Spudis (1952–2018), American planetary geologist
 Josiah Edward Spurr (1870–1950), American, geologist, author and Alaskan explorer
 Laurence Dudley Stamp (1898–1966), British, petroleum geologist and geographer
 Charles Steen (1919–2006), American, discovered uranium near Moab, Utah
 Max Steineke (1898–1952), American, discovered Abqaiq oilfield with 12 billion barrels of recoverable oil in Saudi Arabia
 Charles R. Stelck (1917–2016), Canadian, petroleum geologist, emeritus professor, Logan Medal winner
 Nicolas Steno (1638–1686), Danish, pioneer in early-modern geology, especially in stratigraphy
 Iain Stewart (born 1964), British, presenter of several television series on geology
 Clifford H. Stockwell (1897–1987), Canadian structural geologist, Geological Survey of Canada, Logan Medal winner
 David Strangway (1934–2016), Canadian, geophysicist and university administrator, Logan Medal award
 K. Hugo Strunz (1910–2006), German mineralogist, co-creator of the Nickel–Strunz classification.
 Eduard Suess (1831–1914), Austrian (born England), named Gondwanaland
 Peter Szatmari, Hungarian-Brazilian geologist, Gold Medal award, Sociedade Brasileira de Geologia

T

 Pierre Teilhard de Chardin (1881–1955), French paleontologist and philosopher, co-discovered Peking man
 Karl von Terzaghi (1883–1963), geologist and civil engineer, "father of soil mechanics"
 Marie Tharp (1920–2006), co-discoverer of the Mid-Oceanic Ridge
 Lonnie Thompson (born 1948), American, glaciologist and ice-core climatologist
 Sigurdur Thorarinsson (1912–1983), Icelandic, pioneered the field of tephrochronology
 Raymond Thorsteinsson (1921-2012), Canadian, Arctic geologist
 Phillip Tobias (1925–2012), South African palaeoanthropologist, homo habilis pioneer
 Otto Martin Torell (1828–1900), chief of the Geological Survey of Sweden
 Francis John Turner (1904–1985), New Zealand, igneous and metamorphic petrologist
 Joseph Tyrrell (1858–1957), Canadian paleontologist, namesake of Royal Tyrrell Museum of Palaeontology

U

 Warren Upham (1850–1934), American, studied glacial Lake Agassiz
 David Ure (1749–1798), Scottish, known as "the father of Scottish palaeontology"

V

 Charles-Louis-Joseph-Xavier de la Vallée-Poussin (1827–1903), Belgian geologist and mineralogist
 Jan Veizer (born 1941), Canadian isotope geochemist
 Felix Andries Vening Meinesz (1887–1966), Dutch geophysicist and gravimetric   geodesist
 Rogier Verbeek (1845–1926), Dutch geologist and nature scientist
 Vladimir Vernadsky (1863–1945), pioneer Russian geochemist and biogeochemist
 Fred Vine (born 1939), British marine geologist, geophysicist, plate tectonics pioneer

W

 Lawrence Wager (1904–1965), British geologist and explorer, discovered the Skaergaard intrusion
 Charles Doolittle Walcott (1850–1927), American paleontologist, discovered Burgess Shale fossils
 Roger G. Walker (born 1939), Canadian sedimentologist, emeritus professor
 Wolfgang Sartorius von Waltershausen (1809–1876), German, magnetic observations and study of Mount Etna
 Janet Watson,  (1923–1985), Precambrian specialist, first female president of the Geological Society of London
 Alfred Wegener (1880–1930), German meteorologist, continental drift pioneer
 Harold Wellman (1909–1999), New Zealand geologist of plate tectonics
 Abraham Werner (c. 1749–1817), German, proponent of Neptunism
 Israel Charles White (1848–1927), American, coal geology; Permian paleontology
 Josiah Whitney (1819–1896), chief of the California Geological Survey; Mount Whitney
 Harold Williams (1934–2010), Atlantic Canada geologist
 Howel Williams (1898–1980), American (born England) volcanologist
 John Williamson (1907–1958), discovered the Williamson diamond mine, Tanzania
 J. Tuzo Wilson (1908–1993), Canadian geophysicist and plate tectonics geologist
 Newton Horace Winchell (1839–1914), American, geology of Minnesota
 William Henry Wright (1876–1951), Canadian prospector and newspaper publisher, discovered Kirkland Lake gold district

Y

 Eiju Yatsu (1920–2016), Japanese, geomorphologist
 Ivan Yefremov (1907–1972), Soviet paleontologist and originator of taphonomy
Sorojon Yusufova (1910-1966), Tajik geologist, first person to publish a textbook in the Tajik language

Z

 Peter Ziegler (1928–2013), Swiss petroleum geologist, researched on plate reconstructions and paleogeographies
 Mary Lou Zoback (born 1952), American geophysicist who led the world stress map project of the International Lithosphere Program

See also
 List of geophysicists
 List of mineralogists
 List of paleontologists
 List of Russian geologists

References

Geologists

Geologists